Pismo may refer to:
 The town of Pismo Beach, California
 The Pismo State Beach near Pismo Beach
 Rancho Pismo
 The Pismo clam
 A code name for the fourth version of the PowerBook G3